Prospect Hill is a mountain located in the Catskill Mountains of New York southeast of Kingston. Shaupeneak Mountain is located southwest, and Hussey Hill is located west of Prospect Hill.

References

Mountains of Ulster County, New York
Mountains of New York (state)